Montreal West (French: Montréal-Ouest) is an on-island suburb in southwestern Quebec, Canada, on the Island of Montreal.

Montreal West is a small, close-knit community made up primarily of single-family dwellings. The town is largely composed of families, with 77% of the population speaking  English as their primary language at home, the highest percentage on the island.

Sherbrooke Street, a major artery spanning most of the Island of Montreal, has its western terminus here, beginning at a T-intersection with the town's main street, Westminster Avenue.

History
In 1897, the Town of Montreal West was created when it separated from the Village Municipality of Notre-Dame-de-Grâce-Ouest. It had 50 houses and a population of 350 persons at that time. Its town hall was built in 1910.

On January 1, 2002, as part of the 2002–2006 municipal reorganization in Montreal, Montreal West and the neighbouring suburbs of Côte-Saint-Luc and Hampstead were merged into the City of Montreal and became the borough of Côte-Saint-Luc–Hampstead–Montreal West.  Following a change of government and a 2004 referendum in which the population voted to de-merge by a wide margin, Montreal West was reconstituted as an independent city on January 1, 2006.

Demographics 

Montreal West includes three medium-sized churches. One is United (Montreal West United Church ), one is Anglican (St. Philip's Church), and the final is Presbyterian (Montreal West Presbyterian Church).  The Montreal West United Church also rents space to a Pentecostal service (Overcomers Assembly).  St. Philip's Anglican Church rents space to the New Life Korean Presbyterian Church.

Politics and government

Municipal Council

In terms of services, the town has its own Public Works Department, Public Security Department, a fire station, a community centre (named after former town mayor John A. Simms), and a town hall.

Law enforcement
The town's various codes and ordinances are upheld by its Public Security Department, consisting of a lieutenant with a team of "By-Law Enforcement Constables" under his supervision.

List of mayors
List of former mayors:

1897 - William Smithson Lingley
1898 - Charles McClatchie
1899 - B.W. Grigg
1900 - J.J. Kirkpatrick
1901 - Walter C. Flyfe
1902 - Edward J. Bedbrook
1903 - C.C. Ballantyne
1904 - Edward J. Bedbrook
1905 - William Smithson Lingley
1906 - J.J. Kirkpatrick
1908 - Edward J. Bedbrook
1909–1910 - C.J. Davies
1911–1927 - James Ballantyne
1927–1935 - Harry Aird
1935–1943 - James R. Pearson
1943–1948 - Robert Hope Ross
1948–1954 - George W. Hodgson
1954–1963 - Forest Norman Wiggins
1963–1965 - Everett Charles Kirkpatrick
1965–1973 - Robert Arthur McQueen
1973–1977 - Alistair Reekie
1977–1989 - Roy D. Locke
1989–2001 - John A. Simms
 (2002–2005 - part of the city of Montreal)
2006–2009 - Campbell Stuart
2009–present - Beny Masella

Federal and provincial politics
The Town of Montreal West is located in the federal riding of Notre-Dame-de-Grâce—Westmount, represented by Marc Garneau, and the provincial riding of Notre-Dame-de-Grâce, represented by Désirée McGraw.

Events

Canada Day

Canada Day is the largest community event of the year in Montreal West.  Residents organize a parade route that mainly runs down the main street of Westminster and ends at Strathern Park.  Floats represented in the parade include organizations and clubs located in town, as well as some created personally by residents.

In some years, there have been water fights between sidelined residents and members of the parade (mainly the swimming pool float).  Water fights during these years have seen water balloons and super soaker water guns, as well as the odd hose drawn from a house.  Organizers have tried to minimize these activities in recent years so as not to detract from the parade itself, with varying success.

Following the parade, residents converge on Strathern Park for a giant picnic/BBQ.  Many children's games and activities go on at the park, as well as in the nearby Percival park.  The final event of the evening is the fireworks, which take place around 10pm at Hodgson Field.

Fête Nationale du Québec
Annually on June 23 (the day before the actual holiday) there is a picnic at Davies Park, featuring music performed by Québécois musicians. In the late evening, a large bonfire is held in the centre of the park.

Garbage Bowl
The Garbage Bowl is a yearly tradition held every January 1 since 1950, where men from Montreal West separate into two teams, the Northern Combines in red longjohns and the Southern Bombers in green longjohns, and play a football game in the frigid weather with proceeds from donations, food, and commemorative pins going to charity.

Parks and recreation

The town of Montreal West has a large number of neighbourhood parks and public spaces. They include: Dave Reid Park, Davies Park, George Booth Park, Hodgson Park, John A. Simms Park, Kirkpatrick Park, Memorial Park, Percival Park, Ronald Park, Roy D. Locke Park, Rugby Park, Sheraton Park, Strathearn Park and Toe Blake Park (which was named after former Montreal Canadiens head coach Toe Blake). The town also has an indoor ice skating rink, clay tennis courts, and a public swimming pool.

The core business area of Montreal West is located on Westminster Avenue between Sherbrooke and Curzon.  Until 2010, it consisted exclusively of small, non-franchised businesses, but in a controversial decision, the Pharmaprix drugstore chain was allowed to open a large outlet on the corner of Westminster and Sherbrooke Street.

Public transportation

Montreal West is serviced by six Société de transport de Montréal bus lines.  Each of these connects to a corresponding Montreal Metro (subway) station.  The Montréal-Ouest Train Station also services the area.  Trains that run through this station connect passengers  to downtown Montreal on one end, and three different routes heading away from the city at the other end.

Education

Montreal West is notable for having Quebec's highest rated Anglophone public high school, Royal West Academy (ranked 39th overall in 2005 by the Fraser Institute). It also has two Anglophone elementary schools, Elizabeth Ballantyne Elementary School and Edinburgh Elementary School which offers French immersion. These schools are part of the English Montreal School Board.

The town has a public children's library located in Elizabeth Ballantyne school.   A library for all age groups is located on Westminster Avenue.

Media 
The Town of Montreal West prints a newspaper called The Informer on a monthly basis, excluding the summer. There are 9 editions of The Informer published per year. This newspaper is meant to foster a small-town atmosphere and to keep Montreal West citizens up to date on town information. The Informer was initially published under the name The Citizen's Viewspaper in 1973 by a group of Montreal West citizens before being changed to its current name. The Town of Montreal West has agreed to subsidize this paper to date.

Notable people
 Stuart McLean, writer
 Doug and Dorothy Yeats, Olympic wrestlers

References

External links

Montreal West History

 
Cities and towns in Quebec
Bilingual cities and towns in Quebec
Island of Montreal municipalities